Hermes is the divine messenger of the Olympian gods in Greek mythology.

Hermes may also refer to:

 Hermes Trismegistus, legendary Hellenistic figure and purported author of the Hermetica

Arts, entertainment and media

Fictional characters
 Hermes (Harry Potter), Percy Weasley's owl 
 Hermes (Marvel Comics)
 Hermes Conrad, in the animated TV series Futurama
 Hermes, a talking motorcycle in the anime Kino's Journey
 Hermès Costello, in the manga Stone Ocean
 Hermes,  in Hermes & Renato, a Brazilian comedy troupe
Hermes, in the 2013 video game Goodbye Deponia

Other uses
 Hermes (publication), a literary journal published by the University of Sydney Union
 Hermes (sculpture), Milwaukee, Wisconsin, U.S.
 Hermes Fastening his Sandal, copies of a lost Greek statue
 Hermes Records, an Iranian record label

Businesses 
 Hermès, a French luxury-goods manufacturer
 Hermes Airlines, a Greek airline 2011–2016
 Hermes Aviation, a Maltese airline 2014-2015
 Hermes Europe, a German delivery company
 EFG Hermes, an Egyptian financial services company
 Federated Hermes, an American investment manager
 Hermes Investment Management, a fund manager subsidiary of Federated Hermes
 Hermes Press, an American publisher

Military 
 , the name of several ships of the British Royal Navy
 Hermes-class post ship, a class of Royal Navy sailing ships built in the early 19th century
 Hermes-class sloop, a Royal Navy class of four paddlewheel steam sloops built in the 1830s
 , later USS Lanikai, a yacht commissioned into the U.S. Navy in World War I and World War II
 Hermes program, an American missile development program 1944–1954
 Hermes (missile), a family of Russian guided missiles
 Operation Hermes (disambiguation), the name of several events
 Elbit Hermes 450, an Israeli unmanned aerial vehicle

People
 Hermes (given name), including a list of people with the name
 Hermes (surname), including a list of people with the name

Places
 Hermes, Oise, France
 Hermes Glacier, Antarctica
 Hermes Point, Antarctica

Science and technology 
 HERMES experiment, a particle physics experiment
 Hotspot Ecosystems Research on the Margins of European Seas (HERMES), a deep-sea multidisciplinary project
 HTC Hermes, or HTC TyTN, a personal digital assistant
 Hermes protocol, a machine-to-machine communication standard used in the SMT assembly industry
 Hermes, a brand of typewriters including the Hermes 3000

Aerospace 
 Cirrus Hermes, a British aero engine of the 1930s
 Hermes (satellite), a failed American satellite
 Hermes (spacecraft), a proposed European spaceplane
 Hermes (fictional spacecraft), a spacecraft in the novel and film The Martian

Astronomy 
 69230 Hermes, an asteroid
 HERMES, an instrument fitted to the Anglo-Australian Telescope

Computing 
 Hermes (BBS), bulletin board software
 Hermes (programming language), developed by IBM
 Hermes Project, a C++/Python library of algorithms 
 Hermes, a converter for mass spectrometry data formats
 Hermes, codename of the ORiNOCO family of wireless networking technology by Proxim Wireless

Sports
 Hermes DVS, a Dutch omnisport club
 Hermes F.C., a Scottish football club 
 Kokkolan Hermes, a Finnish ice hockey team 
 Hermes Ladies' Hockey Club, an Irish field hockey club

Transportation 
 Hermes Road Measurement System
 Handley Page Hermes, a 1940s/1950s British airliner
 , later MV Pozarica, a cargo ship launched in 1945

Other uses 
 HERMES method, a project management method developed by the Swiss government

See also 

 Hermis, an American racehorse foaled in 1899
 Hermetic (disambiguation) 
 Ermes (disambiguation)